Eriks de Souza Santos Pereira (born 23 February 1996) is a Brazilian professional footballer.

Club career

Internacional
Eriks Santos is a product of Sport Club Internacional youth sportive system. During 2015–2017 he played for this club in the youth level, but never made a debut for the main squad team.

Mariupol
In August 2017, Santos signed a two-year deal with Ukrainian Premier League side FC Mariupol. On 25 October 2017, he made his professional debut as a starter in the Ukrainian Cup against Tavriya Simferopol. On 5 November 2017, he made his league debut as a substitute in a 3–1 loss to Shakhtar Donetsk.

Dila Gori
In July 2018, Santos signed with Georgian Erovnuli Liga side Dila Gori, and made fourteen league appearances that season and one appearance in the Georgian Cup. The following season, he made 23 league appearances and one in the Georgian Cup.

HFX Wanderers
On 25 February 2020, Santos signed with Canadian Premier League side HFX Wanderers. However, due to travel restrictions caused by the COVID-19 pandemic, he was unable to join the club for the 2020 season, finally joining the club in May 2021 for pre-season training for the 2021 season. In January 2022, Santos had his club option exercised by HFX, keeping him at the club through 2022. After the conclusion of the 2022 CPL season, Santos' contract option was declined by the Wanderers, ending his time at the club.

Career statistics

Honours
HFX Wanderers
 Canadian Premier League
Runners-up: 2020

References

External links
Eriks Santos at playmakerstats.com (English version of ceroacero.es)

1996 births
Living people
Association football defenders
Brazilian footballers
Sportspeople from Maranhão
Brazilian expatriate footballers
Expatriate footballers in Ukraine
Brazilian expatriate sportspeople in Ukraine
Expatriate footballers in Georgia (country)
Brazilian expatriate sportspeople in Georgia (country)
Expatriate soccer players in Canada
Brazilian expatriate sportspeople in Canada
Sport Club Internacional players
FC Mariupol players
FC Dila Gori players
HFX Wanderers FC players
Ukrainian Premier League players
Erovnuli Liga players
Canadian Premier League players
Brazil youth international footballers